Lea Giménez (Asunción, 1981) is a Paraguayan economist. She was the 121st finance minister of Paraguay and the first woman to hold this position in the country's history. Upon taking office, she became the youngest finance minister in Latin America, one of four with a doctorate from a university out of a total of 20 ministers and the only woman.

In 2017, América Economía magazine described Lea Giménez as the Paraguayan promise, "a symbol of the Paraguayan economic boom: incipient, novel and promising."

Education
Giménez completed her secondary education in the United States. She earned a BA from Emporia State University, a Master's Degree from the University of Iowa and a Ph.D. from Lehigh University, all in economics. She also completed the Executive Program on Macro Financial Policy in Emerging Markets at Columbia University and the Executive Program on the Digital Transformation of Government: Policy Innovation and Public Service at the University of Harvard. Her doctoral dissertation received the "Elizabeth B. Stout Dissertation Award" for making an unusually significant and original contribution to economics.

Career
Giménez was an economist in the World Bank's Global Poverty and Macro-Taxation Practices serving countries in Asia, Latin America, and the Caribbean. Her work at the international level focused on the development and implementation of policies and strategies for poverty reduction, the promotion of inclusive economic growth, the institutional strengthening of public entities, the creation of institutional capacities, the promotion of evidence-based policies, and the improvement of coordination among multilateral organizations to maximize the impact of their efforts. She also served as an adjunct professor at Lehigh University.

She chaired the Technical Economic Tax Commission of Paraguay, the Excellence Fund for Education of Paraguay, and the Commission of the National Strategy for Financial Inclusion. Between 2017 and 2018, she chaired the Board of Governors of the Inter-American Development Bank. Previously, she served as Vice-Minister of Economy of the Paraguayan Ministry of Finance, becoming the first woman in Paraguay to hold that position.

During the presidency of Horacio Cartes, she served as Paraguay's Minister of Finance, becoming the first woman to hold this position in the history of Paraguay.

Since February 2019, she is the Head of the Division of Innovation in Citizen Services (ICS) of the Inter-American Development Bank.

Publications

Research
 Chen, Cheng, Shin-Yi Chou, Lea Gimenez, and Jin-Tan Liu. 2020. The Quantity of Education and Preference for Sons: Evidence from Taiwan's Compulsory Education Reform, China Economic Review 59: 101369.
 Qian, Mengcen, Shin-Yi Chou, Lea Gimenez, and Jin-Tan Liu. 2017. The Intergenerational Transmission of Low Birth Weight and Intrauterine Growth Restriction: A Large Cross-generational Cohort Study in Taiwan, Maternal and Child Health Journal 21 (7), pp. 1512–1521.
 Gimenez, Lea, Dean Jolliffe, and Iffath Sharif. 2014. Bangladesh, a Middle Income Country by 2021: What Will It Take in terms of Poverty Reduction?, The Bangladesh Development Studies 37 (1-2).
 Gimenez, Lea, and Dean Jolliffe. 2014. Inflation for the Poor in Bangladesh: A Comparison of CPI and Household Survey Data, The Bangladesh Development Studies 37 (1-2).
 Gimenez, Lea, Shin-Yi Chou, Jin-Tan Liu, and Jin-Long Liu. 2013. Parental Loss and Children's Well-Being, The Journal of Human Resources 48 (4), pp. 1035–1071.

Books
 Giménez, Lea, Carlos Rodríguez-Castelán and Daniel Valderrama. 2015. Shared Prosperity in Colombia, in Shared Prosperity and Poverty Eradication in Latin America and the Caribbean (eds. Ed. Cord, Louise, Maria Eugenia Genoni, and Carlos Rodríguez-Castelán), pp. 99–134, Washington, D.C.: Banco Mundial.
 Giménez, Lea and Carmen Marín. 2018. Retos y Oportunidades del Sistema de Jubilaciones y Pensiones del Paraguay en Sistema Financiero Paraguayo. Construyendo sobre sólidos fundamentos paraguayos. Banco Central del Paraguay, pp. 114–147.

Policy notes and reports
 Lea Giménez, María Ana Lugo, Sandra Martínez, Humberto Colman, Juan José Galeano and Gabriela Farfán. 2017. Paraguay: Análisis del sistema fiscal y su impacto en la pobreza y la equidad, CEQ Working Paper 74, Commitment to Equity (CEQ) Institute, Tulane University.
 Giménez, Lea, Sara Hause Van Wie, Miriam Muller, Rebecca F. Shutte, Megan Z. Rounseville and Martha C. Viveros Mendoz. 2015. Enhancing Youth Skills and Economic Opportunities to Reduce Teenage Pregnancy in Colombia, Washington, D.C.: Banco Mundial.
 Giménez, Lea, Edwin St. Catherine, Jonathan Karver y Rei Odawara. 2015. The Aftermath of the 2008 Global Financial Crisis in the Eastern Caribbean - The Impact on the St. Lucia Labor Market, Washington, D.C.: Banco Mundial.
 Rodríguez-Castelán, Carlos, Lea Giménez y Tania Diaz Bazan. 2014. Colombia's 2012 Tax Reform Poverty and Social Impact Analysis, Washington, D.C.: Banco Mundial.
 Rodríguez-Castelán, Carlos, Lea Giménez y Daniel Valderrama. 2014. Chapter 2: Toward Shared Prosperity in Colombia, in Towards Sustainable Peace, Poverty Eradication, and Shared Prosperity – Colombia Policy Notes. Washington, D.C.: Banco Mundial.
 Rodríguez-Castelán, Carlos, Lea Giménez y Daniel Valderrama. 2014. Chapter 2: Hacia La Paz Sostenible, La Erradicación De La Pobreza y La Prosperidad Compartida – Notas de Política: Colombia. Washington, D.C.: Banco Mundial.
 Jolliffe, Dean, Iffath Sharif, Lea Giménez y Faizuddin Ahmed. 2013. Bangladesh - Poverty assessment: Assessing a decade of progress in reducing poverty, 2000-2010, Bangladesh Development Series no. 31, Washington, D.C.: Banco Mundial.

References

Living people
1981 births
20th-century Paraguayan women
Paraguayan economists
Women economists
Finance Ministers of Paraguay
Women government ministers of Paraguay
21st-century Paraguayan women politicians
21st-century Paraguayan politicians
Emporia State University alumni
University of Iowa alumni
Lehigh University alumni
People from Asunción
20th-century economists
21st-century economists